Syzeton subfasciatus is a species of ant-like leaf beetle in the family Aderidae. It is found in North America.

This species was formerly a member of the genus Zonantes. The species of that genus were transferred to the genus Syzeton as a result of research published in 2022.

References

Aderidae
Articles created by Qbugbot
Beetles described in 1875